"Tie Our Love (In a Double Knot)" is a song written by Jeff Silbar and John Reid, and recorded by American entertainer Dolly Parton. It was released in February 1986 as the fourth single from Parton's album Real Love. (The song also appeared on Think About Love, a 1986 album of previously issued Parton material.) The song reached #17 on the Billboard Hot Country Singles & Tracks chart.

Chart performance

References

1986 singles
1985 songs
Dolly Parton songs
Song recordings produced by David Malloy
RCA Records singles
Songs written by Jeff Silbar